Rigel's Revenge is a text adventure published in 1987 for the Amstrad CPC, Commodore 64, and ZX Spectrum home computers by Mastertronic on their "Bulldog" label. It was written by British studio Smart Egg Software using a heavily modified version of The Quill, an adventure-authoring package.

Plot 

Harper and Elliot, two 23rd-century investigative journalists, have joined an organisation called the Alterian Corps in order to further their careers.  They have been sent on a mission to the planet Rigel V which is in a state of war with one region holding out against the Federation troops attempting to conquer it.  The Rigellians claim to possess a Doomsday Machine which will enact a terrible revenge if the Federation refuse to withdraw from the planet. Elliot has been smuggled in by the Alterian Corps in the guise of a Rigellian trooper with a mission to locate the whereabouts of the Doomsday Machine and report to Harper who is to follow one week later. Harper has instructions to meet Elliot at night in a certain backstreet in the occupied sector of the town.

Gameplay 

The player takes control of Harper.  The parser accepts standard text adventure commands and can understand simple sentences such as THROW RUBBLE AT THE TANK and LOOK INSIDE THE SATCHEL.
The game's interaction with the player is mainly through text output, but occasionally during the game static graphics are displayed.

Development

Reception

References

External links 
 
 
 

1980s interactive fiction
1987 video games
Amstrad CPC games
Commodore 64 games
Fiction set around Rigel
Mastertronic games
Video games developed in the United Kingdom
ZX Spectrum games